Monrepos is an archaeological research centre and a museum of human behavioural evolution located at Schloss Monrepos in Neuwied. The development of our modern human behaviour in the Palaeolithic and Mesolithic is studied at the research centre and the findings of these studies are conveyed to the public in the museum. Monrepos is one of the leading institutions for the research of early human history.

Structure
Monrepos is part of the Romano-Germanic Central Museum (Mainz) a member of the Gottfried Wilhelm Leibniz Scientific Community.
Another provider for Monrepos is the Prinz Maximilian zu Wied-Stiftung, supported by the Förderkreis Altsteinzeit e.V., which assists with research, teaching and the conveying of research results.
Monrepos collaborates closely with the Institute for Prehistoric Archaeology of the Johannes Gutenberg University of Mainz.

Location
Monrepos (French: "my rest") is a historical recreation area located on the hills above the town of Neuwied in a transition zone between the Middle Rhine valley and the Westerwald. In the extensive forests of Monrepos several long-distance hiking trails cross such as the Rheinsteig, the Rheinhöhenweg Trail, and a trail along the remains of the limes. The previous summer residence of the princes of Wied is today the centre of an ensemble of historic buildings from the 18th and 19th century.

History

Until 2012, Monrepos had been named "research unit Palaeolithic“ (Forschungsbereich Altsteinzeit) of the RGZM and "museum for Ice Age archaeology“ (Museum für die Archäologie des Eiszeitalters). The discovery and study of famous Palaeolithic sites in the Neuwied Basin such as Niederbieber, Gönnersdorf, and Bad Breisig led to the foundation of the research unit Palaeolithic of the RGZM in 1984. Along with the museum for Ice Age archaeology the research unit has been located on Schloss Monrepos since 1988. The house was built in 1909. It was originally named "Waldheim" (forest home) and served as home for the princely widows. In 1986, Prince Friedrich Wilhelm of Wied brought the Schloss into the foundation Prince Maximilian of Wied

Besides functioning as the head of the Forschungsbereich Altsteinzeit, Gerhard Bosinski, the founder of the institute, was also professor at the institute of prehistoric archaeology of the University of Cologne. Since 2003 Sabine Gaudzinski-Windheuser has been the head of Monrepos and she is also the professor at the institute of prehistory and early history of the University of Mainz.

2005 the exhibition of the museum for Ice Age archaeology was modernised but in 2011 the museum had to be closed temporary due to extensive renovation and reconstruction works of Schloss Monrepos. The museum is re-organised currently and will be re-opened with a new concept, probably in late 2013.

Temporal and geographic frame of research
The research at Monrepos encompasses the early human history of the Old World from its beginnings to the invention and spread of agriculture and stock farming. During the 1980s and early 1990s, the studies focused particularly on the rich archaeological sites from the Neuwied basin and its vicinity.: The Lower Palaeolithic site at Miesenheim is approximately 600,000 years old and among the oldest settlement sites in Central Europe. Sites in former volcano craters in the eastern Eifel such as the Schweinskopf, the "Wannen“ volcano group, the Tönchesberg, and the Plaidter Hummerich are worldwide the only settlement sites of this type inhabited by Neanderthals  Important sites of the Magdalenian were excavated and studied at Andernach-Martinsberg and Gönnersdorf. Many sites studied at Monrepos such as Niederbieber, Bad Breisig, Kettig, Urbar, and the upper horizons of Andernach-Martinsberg were attributed to the so-called Federmesser groups which are a similar behavioural development as the French Azilian in the late Ice Age. Their remarkably good preservation due to the cover by tephras of the Laacher See volcanic eruption made exceptional insights into the land-use of this period possible 
Since the late 1990s the geographic frame of research at Monrepos has been broadened. In international cooperation projects sites such as Ubeidiya and Gesher Benot Ya'aqov in Israel have been examined. In Dmanisi in Georgia, Monrepos has excavated the oldest Eurasian site with hominid remains. Current excavation projects are conducted in Romania where the oldest sites in Eastern Europe are recovered and at the Taforalt in Morocco where the behaviour of early modern humans is studied and the oldest pieces of human adornment were found.
Analyses of Mesolithic sites such as Duvensee or Bedburg-Königshoven  are chronologically the youngest studies performed at Monrepos.

Guiding principle of research
The research and the conveying of its results aim at understanding the essential behavioural characteristics of modern humans and the development of these characteristics during the Palaeolithic and Mesolithic periods from 2.5 Million years to approximately 7,500 years ago.

Monrepos is among the few archaeological research institutions which are guided by an own principle of research. This principle defines the objectives of research and the strategy necessary to achieve these objectives. The principle of research is based on an integrative, holistic understanding of science. Thereby, it merges the traditional dichotomy of Social and Natural Sciences. Different sources of evidence and variable contexts are connected diachronically in the principle of research. They are pooled in three research units: "time slices“, "strategies”and “social organisation”. "Time slices“ relates to the group of questions of where, when, and in which frame of references human behaviour evolved. The research units "strategies“ and "social organisation“ try to identify survival strategies and behavioural patterns as well as their social embedding.
The research principle is oriented diachronically and perspectively. That means that the research is systematically looking at different time periods and levels of resolution. Large frames allow for an orientation, whereas more detailed frames allow for a punctually high resolution.
By the use of a synthetic comparison of the three research units and the comparative transfer between the different time periods and levels of resolution, it is possible to reconstruct the development of human behaviour in the Palaeolithic and Mesolithic.

Research foci

Particularly relevant research foci in the study of the behavioural development of early humans and hominids are the processes relating to subsistence patterns, mobility, settlement behaviour, and land-use patterns of Palaeolithic and Mesolithic hunter-gatherers.

Calibration and Dating programmes
Since the mid-1980s, Monrepos has been involved in the construction and improvement of an absolute chronology of the European Palaeolithic. In this process, comprehensive dating programs of the Upper Palaeolithic were initiated  Innovative methods of radiocarbon calibration were developed by Olaf Jöris (Monrepos) and Bernhard Weninger (University of Cologne). These methods became constantly better and made precise calibration of increasingly older radiocarbon dates possible by the connection with high-resolution climate data sets. The calibration program CalPal  is based on this approach and was first created by Olaf Jöris and Bernhard Weninger in the mid-1990s.

Subsistence
Hunting of big game is an important ability in the development of early hominid subsistence. Monrepos has set an international standard in the study of hominid hunting by the use of an elaborated set of archaeozoological methods and a diachronic perspective. For instance, big game hunting by early hominids and its evolutionary relevance was demonstrated for the first time in the archaeological record by a member of Monrepos 
Currently, the research mainly focuses on Neanderthals' hunting behaviour in the context of land use. This behaviour is examined particularly in cave sites such as the Balve cave or the Moravian Kůlna Cave and at the largest Middle Palaeolithic open air site in Neumark-Nord.
Further research projects relating to subsistence concentrate on the late Ice age and the early Holocene. Studies from concentrations at the Mesolithic site of Duvensee were the first to show the significance of vegetation resources (hazelnuts) in the early Holocene subsistence.

Settlement behaviour
The investigation and analysis of the evolution of settlement and land use behaviour represent another research focus at MONREPOS. Since its inception the systematic analysis of extensively-excavated open-air sites and settlement structures has always been a focus at MONREPOS. Current research involves the application of GIS supported geo-statistical approaches that allow for quantitative and verifiable analyses of settlement dynamics.
. The wide spectrum of investigated sites allows for a diachronic comparison of settlement and land use behaviours and their links with environmental change and socio-economic factors. Current projects involve the sites of Neumark-Nord, Bilizingsleben, Niederbieber, Breitenbach, Magdalena-cave, Gönnersdorf, Andernach, Oelknitz and Duvensee.

Art
The analytic-integrative approach to Palaeolithic art is another defining feature of work at Monrepos that was developed coinciding with the discovery and investigation of the famous engraved Magdalenian slate plaquettes from Gönnersdorf through Gerhard Bosinski. It was thus possible to conclusively demonstrate that art was a major component in the Palaeolithic of Central Europe and “type Gönnersdorf” figurines represent a major category in art studies. The particular manner in which art is studied  at MONREPOS is characterised by a contextualised approach that aims to understand the principles and rules behind patterns in design and production. The plaquettes are currently part of a detailed 3-D analysis.

Experimental archaeology
Since the 1980s controlled experiments relating to hunting techniques, processing of carcasses, and taphonomy have been conducted in Monrepos under laboratory conditions.

Education and promotion of young scientists
Members of Monrepos regularly give lectures and seminars about the evolution of human behaviour in the Palaeolithic and Mesolithic at the Institute of Prehistory and Early History at the university of Mainz. The archaeological education is supplemented by internships, excursions, und field schools allowing for direct participation in science and conveying. Junior scientists are promoted individually by a mentoring programme and also financially by scholarships such as the Prince Maximilian of Wied-scholarship.

Museum

The permanent exhibition presents the results of archaeological research into the origins and early evolution of human behaviour. Due to the renovations the museum was closed in 2010. It is expected to re-open with a new concept and exhibit at the end of 2013.

Conveying
In addition to the Museum and its teaching involvement at the Institute for Pre- and Early History at Mainz University, Monrepos has also developed other formats of public outreach. The Rudolf Virchow lecture is one of the most longstanding public archaeological lectures in Germany. This annual event honours the accomplishments of an eminent researcher in the field of Palaeolithic archaeology, who presents the results of his or her research in a popular lecture held at Neuwied castle. The “SteinZeitReise” (“Trip to the Stone Age”) is an annual „hands on „event held on Pentecost Sunday at Monrepos. Members of staff demonstrate various aspects of Palaeolithic life and the public is invited to try out flint-knapping, atlatl-throwing and archaeological excavation. Innovative special exhibits, for example, GANZ ALT - die Archäologie des Eiszeitalters umgesetzt von Otmar Alt“ connect Palaeolithic art with modern art and current affairs.

Collections

Osteological collection
The comparative collection is primarily made up of animal specimens, which are complemented by a small inventory of human remains. The faunal inventory consists primarily of European ice age faunas and/or their extant representatives. In addition to large mammals (mammoth, rhino, bison, horse), the collection also includes remains of extant smaller mammals and birds. The taphonomic collection includes modern and archaeological materials that exhibit various pathologies and show signatures of specific taphonomic processes and agents, as well as experimentally modified bone.

Lithic raw material collection
The raw material collection includes samples of flint, which served as raw material for the production of artefacts during the Middle- and Upper Palaeolithic. The collection currently houses approximately 230 samples from various locales, with the majority of samples coming from locales in the Rhineland.

Collection of archaeological artefacts
The artefact collection is made up of approximately 4500 artefacts from the Middle- and Upper Palaeolithic. Specimens include both authentic pieces as well as copies made by restoration department at the RGZM. An important component of the artefact collection is the Venus statue archive. With over 50 specimens the venus collection is the biggest of its kind world-wide. It includes originals and copies of all female figurines known from the Mid-Upper Palaeolithic. The artefact collection also houses engraved schist plaquettes from Gönnersdorf and figurines from the early and late Upper Palaeolithic.

Library
The library at Monrepos contains more than 70,000 titles on Palaeolithic and Mesolithic archaeology. It is complemented by a comprehensive collection of special editions and an electronic database of periodicals.

Literature
 
 
 Hannelore Bosinski: 15 Jahre Museum für die Archäologie des Eiszeitalters. Eine ganz persönliche Rückschau. In: Heimatjahrbuch des Landkreises Neuwied. 2005, S. 53–60.
 Sabine Gaudzinski-Windheuser, Olaf Jöris (Hrsg.): 600.000 Jahre Menschheitsgeschichte in der Mitte Europas. Begleitbuch zur Ausstellung im Museum für die Archäologie des Eiszeitalters, Schloss Monrepos, Neuwied. Verlag des Römisch-Germanischen Zentralmuseums, Mainz 2006, .

Human Roots Award
The Human Roots Award is a €10,000 prize recognising "outstanding impact or great influence in understanding the archaeology of our behavioural evolution". It was established by Monrepos in 2017 and endowed by a private donor. The inaugural prize was awarded to evolutionary biologist Richard Dawkins in a ceremony at Monrepos schloss.

References

External links
 official webpage of Monrepos (RGZM)

Anthropological research institutes
Museums in Germany
Research institutes in Germany
Paleolithic